Liberia was a  professional cycling team that existed from 1954 to 1962.

References

External links

Cycling teams based in France
Defunct cycling teams based in France
1954 establishments in France
1962 disestablishments in France
Cycling teams established in 1954
Cycling teams disestablished in 1962